This list is of the Cultural Properties of Japan designated in the category of  for the Urban Prefecture of Kyōto.

National Cultural Properties
As of 1 September 2015, four hundred and eighty-two Important Cultural Properties (including forty-four *National Treasures) have been designated, being of national significance.

Prefectural Cultural Properties
As of 24 March 2015, fifty-nine properties have been designated at a prefectural level.

Municipal Cultural Properties
Properties designated at a municipal level include:

See also
 Cultural Properties of Japan
 List of National Treasures of Japan (paintings)
 Japanese painting
 List of Cultural Properties of Japan - paintings (Tōkyō)

References

External links
  Cultural Properties in Kyoto Prefecture
  Municipal Cultural Properties in Kyoto City

Cultural Properties,Kyoto
Cultural Properties,Paintings
Paintings,Kyoto
Lists of paintings